Lethbridge-West is an Alberta provincial electoral district, covering the western half of the city of Lethbridge, including all of West Lethbridge.

Under the Alberta electoral boundary re-distribution of 2004, 13 Street forms most of the dividing line between Lethbridge-East and Lethbridge West. Scenic Drive and 16 Avenue South form a small part of the boundary. Clockwise from Lethbridge-East, the constituency is bounded at the city limits by Little Bow, by Livingstone-Macleod and then again by Little Bow.

The current Member of the Legislative Assembly for this district is New Democrat Shannon Phillips.

History
The electoral district was created in the 1971 boundary redistribution from the old electoral district of Lethbridge when it was split in half.

The 2010 boundary redistribution made some minor revisions to equalize the population between West and East. North of St. Edward Blvd the boundary was pushed west from 13 Street to Stafford Drive.

Boundary history

Representation history

The electoral district was created in 1971 from the old Lethbridge district when it was split in half. Prior to 1971 the city returned candidates from a number of different banners. The first representative returned in the election held that year was Social Credit candidate Richard Gruenwald who won the district with well over half of the popular vote.

Gruenwald would run for a second term in the 1975 election and would be defeated finishing a distant second place behind Progressive Conservative candidate John Gogo who took almost 60% of the popular vote. Gogo would win his next two terms in 1979 and 1982 with increasing majorities achieving almost 70% of the popular vote.

Gogo would lose significant popularity upon re-election to his fourth term in 1986. He would fall from 70% the previous election to under half. He would hold his seat for a final term in 1989 when he took just over 45% of the popular vote. In his last term in office Premier Don Getty appointed Gogo as Minister of Advanced education He held that until 1992. Gogo retired from dissolution of the Assembly in 1993.

The 1993 election saw a hotly contested race between Progressive Conservative candidate Clint Dunford and Liberal candidate Michael Dietrich. Dunford won by a razor thin margin of just over 100 votes to hold the seat for his party and taking just over 41% of the popular vote.

Dunford was re-elected in 1997 winning a slightly higher plurality. After the election he was appointed to the provincial cabinet by Premier Ralph Klein as Minister of Advanced Education and Career Development. In 1999 he was shuffled to the Minister of Human Resources and Employment portfolio.

Dunford ran for his third term in 2001 increasing his plurality slightly taking 48% of the popular vote and kept his cabinet post. He ran for his fourth term in office in 2004 and fell to an all-time low holding his seat with just 39% of the popular vote. After that election he was shuffled to the Minister of Economic Development until 2006. Dunford retired from the legislature in 2008.

The fourth representative returned from the riding was Progressive Conservative candidate Greg Weadick who won his first term as MLA in 2008, and was re-elected in 2012, but was defeated in the 2015 general election by Shannon Phillips of the NDP. In 2019, Phillips held onto the riding with a reduced margin of victory over the second-place finishing UCP candidate with just 45% of the popular vote.

Legislature results

Elections in the 1970s

|}

|}

|}

Elections in the 1980s

|}

|}

|}

Elections in the 1990s

|}

|}

Elections in the 2000s

|}

|}

Elections in the 2010s

Senate nominee results

2004 Senate nominee election district results
Voters had the option of selecting 4 Candidates on the Ballot

2012 Senate nominee election district results

Student Vote results

2004 election

On November 19, 2004, a Student Vote was conducted at participating Alberta schools to parallel the 2004 Alberta general election results. The vote was designed to educate students and simulate the electoral process for persons who have not yet reached the legal majority. The vote was conducted in 80 of the 83 provincial electoral districts with students voting for actual election candidates. Schools with a large student body that reside in another electoral district had the option to vote for candidates outside of the electoral district then where they were physically located.

2012 election

References

External links
Legislative Assembly of Alberta

Alberta provincial electoral districts
Politics of Lethbridge